Dillons is a grocery supermarket chain based in Hutchinson, Kansas, and is a division of Kroger. Other banners under Dillon Stores Division include Gerbes in Missouri and Baker's in Omaha, Nebraska. Dillons operates grocery stores throughout Kansas with major influences in and around Wichita, Topeka, Manhattan, and Lawrence. Dillons also operates distribution centers in Goddard and Hutchinson.

History

In 1890, John S. Dillon opened a general store in Sterling, Kansas, and learned that allowing customers to charge then pay later and delivering groceries to their homes was a financial and manpower strain on his business. In 1913, he opened his "J.S. Dillon Cash Store" in Hutchinson, Kansas employed a new marketing concept called cash and carry, where the store would not offer credit or delivery services. Dillon opened a second store in 1915 that he managed then placed his son, Ray E. Dillon, in charge of the original store. In 1917, the company was incorporated under the name "Dillon Mercantile Company, Inc". Due to his sons John and Ray both being overseas in France during World War I, Dillon sold his company to his investment partners, but soon afterward both sons returned. They opened a new store called "J.S. Dillon and Sons Store" in 1919 and incorporated in 1921.

In 1983, Dillon Companies, Inc., was acquired by The Kroger Company of Cincinnati, Ohio, creating a nationwide grocery chain. Several years later, David Dillon was named Kroger's president and COO and became CEO in 2003. Dillon retired from that position effective January 1, 2014.

In 2006, Kroger opened the first Dillons Marketplace in Wichita.

Gerbes

Frank J. Gerbes founded Gerbes Super Markets, Inc. in Tipton, Missouri in 1933. The location in Tipton closed in 2007.

In 1966, Gerbes merged with the Dillon Companies, and has been a division ever since. Kroger currently operates seven stores under the Gerbes banner in Mid-Missouri. 

Gerbes operates in Mid-Missouri.

See also
 City Market
 Fry's Food and Drug
 King Soopers

References

External links
 

1913 establishments in Kansas
1983 mergers and acquisitions
Companies based in Kansas
Hutchinson, Kansas
Kroger
Reno County, Kansas
Retail companies established in 1913
Supermarkets of the United States